Müjdat Karanfilci (born 28 February 1950) is a former Turkey international football forward who played for clubs in Turkey and a manager.

Career
Born in Gelibolu, Karanfilci started playing senior football for local side İstanbulspor A.Ş. He had spells with Giresunspor and Mersin İdmanyurdu SK, before joining Adana Demirspor. He spent six seasons with Adana Demirspor making 152 Süper Lig appearances and scoring 45 goals for the club.

Karanfilci made two appearances for the Turkey national football team in 1977.

After he retired from playing football, Karanfilci became a manager for several lower-level Turkish clubs. He was appointed manager of Adana Demirspor in 2006.

References

External links
 
 
 
 Müjdat Karanfilci manager stats at Mackolik.com 

1950 births
Living people
Turkish footballers
İstanbulspor footballers
Giresunspor footballers
Mersin İdman Yurdu footballers
Adana Demirspor footballers
Turkish football managers
Adana Demirspor managers
Association footballers not categorized by position